The 2017 Women's Rugby World Cup was the eighth edition of the Women's Rugby World Cup and was held in Ireland in August 2017. New Zealand became the 2017 champions by beating England 41–32 in the final on 26 August. Matches were held in Dublin and Belfast. The pool stages were held at University College Dublin with the semi finals and finals held at Queen's University and Kingspan Stadium in Belfast.

The tournament took place three rather than four years after the previous Women's Rugby World Cup because World Rugby wanted to move away from clashing with other events. The event returned to a four-year cycle after 2017.

The 2017 tournament set attendance records for a Women's World Cup. The tournament drew 45,412 fans over 30 matches. The final was played in front of a crowd of 17,115, and the pool matches sold out.

This was the last edition of the tournament under the "Women's Rugby World Cup" name. On 21 August 2019, World Rugby announced that all future World Cups, whether for men or women, would be officially titled as the "Rugby World Cup", distinguished only by year and not by gender. As such, the 2021 edition in New Zealand bore the title of "Rugby World Cup 2021".

Bidding process 

On 2 March 2015, it was announced that the Irish Rugby Football Union had submitted a bid to host to Women's Rugby World Cup in August 2017. The Irish bid was the only one made to host the event. On 13 May 2015 it was announced that Ireland would host the event in Dublin and Belfast.

On 4 June 2015 it was announced that Garrett Tubridy had been appointed tournament director for the event.

Qualifying

Ireland, the host nation, had already qualified automatically by finishing in the top seven teams at the 2014 tournament before being announced as hosts. A further six teams (England, Canada, France, New Zealand, USA and Australia) qualified automatically as top seven finishers at the 2014 tournament. Italy and Wales qualified as the top two teams across the 2015 and 2016 Women's Six Nations excluding England, France, and Ireland. The remaining three qualifiers (Hong Kong, Spain and Japan) were determined by the end of 2016.

Qualified teams

Match officials
In March 2017, World Rugby announced the 9 referees and 5 assistant referees for the tournament.

In August 2017, it was announced that Irish referee Joy Neville would adjudicate the final.

Referees (9)
  Tim Baker
  Aimee Barrett-Theron
  Graham Cooper
  Sara Cox
  Sean Gallagher
  Claire Hodnett
  Joy Neville
  Alhambra Nievas
  Amy Perrett

Assistants (5)
  Beatrice Benvenuti
  Rose Labreche
  Marie Lematte
  Helen O'Reilly
  Ian Tempest

Squads

Pool stage

The pool draw took place on 9 November 2016 at Belfast.

Each pool was a single round-robin of six games, in which each team played one match against each of the other teams in the same pool. Teams were awarded four points for a win, two points for a draw, one point for a loss by one to seven points, and none for a defeat by more than seven points. A team scoring four or more tries in one match scored a bonus point.

The tournament comprised 12 teams in three pools of four with the pool winners plus the best runner-up progressing to the semi-finals.

All times are local, Western European Summer Time (UTC+1).

Pool A

Pool B

Pool C

Finals

Knockout Rankings
At the completion of the pool stage, teams were ranked first according to their position within their pool (positions 1 to 3 were the pool winners, positions 4 to 6 were the pool runners up, etc.) and then by competition points. The top four teams progressed to the tournament semi-finals, teams ranked 5–8 progressed to the 5th to 8th play-offs, and the teams ranked 9–12 progressed to the 9th to 12th play-offs.

Tie breakers
If teams were tied on pool points they were ranked by rules applied in the following order –
1. The team that won the match between the two teams was ranked first (does not apply to teams in different pools) 
2. If the teams were still level, the difference between points scored and points conceded was used to rank the teams
3. Difference between tries scored and tries conceded was used to rank the teams
4. Most points scored 
5. Most tries scored 
6. Coin toss

Play-offs: 9th to 12th

Ninth to twelfth semifinals

Eleventh place playoff

Ninth place playoff

Play-offs 5th to 8th

Fifth to eighth semifinals

Seventh place playoff

Fifth place playoff

Finals
The team ranked first after the pool stages played the team ranked fourth and the team ranked second played the team ranked third.

Semifinals

Third place playoff

Final

Final classification

Broadcasting
: Foxtel
: TSN and RDS
: Eurosport and France Télévisions
: Eir Sport and RTÉ
: RTVE
: ITV
: NBC Sports

See also
Rugby World Cup
Rugby World Cup Sevens

References

External links
Official Site

 
2017
2017 rugby union tournaments for national teams
2017 in women's rugby union
2017 in Irish women's sport
International women's rugby union competitions hosted by Ireland
International sports competitions hosted by University College Dublin
August 2017 sports events in Europe
2017–18 in Irish rugby union
2017 in Northern Ireland sport
2010s in Dublin (city)
Sports competitions in Belfast
21st century in Belfast